Skatole or 3-methylindole is an organic compound belonging to the indole family. It occurs naturally in the feces of mammals and birds and is the primary contributor to fecal odor. In low concentrations, it has a flowery smell and is found in several flowers and essential oils, including those of orange blossoms, jasmine, and Ziziphus mauritiana.

It is used as a fragrance and fixative in many perfumes and as an aroma compound. Its name derives from the Greek root skato-, meaning feces.  Skatole was discovered in 1877 by the German physician Ludwig Brieger (1849–1919).

Original:  "Ich habe mich zuerst mit der Untersuchung der flüchtigen Bestandtheile der Excremente aus sauerer Lösung beschäftigt.  Es wurden dabei die flüchtigen Fettsäuren:  Essigsäure, normale und Isobuttersäure, sowie die aromatischen Substanzen:  Phenol, Indol und eine neue dem Indol verwandte Substanz, die ich Skatol nennen werde, erhalten."

Translation:  "I was occupied initially with the investigation of the volatile components of excrement in acidic solution.  One obtained thereby volatile fatty acids; acetic acid; normal and isobutyric acid; as well as the aromatic substances: phenol, indole and a new substance which is related to indole and which I will name 'skatole'."   - Brieger (1878), page 130

Biosynthesis, chemical synthesis, and reactions
Skatole is derived from the amino acid tryptophan in the digestive tract of mammals.  Tryptophan is converted to indoleacetic acid, which decarboxylates to give the methylindole.

Skatole can be synthesized via the Fischer indole synthesis.

It gives a violet color upon treatment with potassium ferrocyanide.

Skatole, along with the fecal odorant indole, can be neutralized by combining it with other scents, by producing perfumes or air fresheners that lack skatole and indole. In a manner similar to noise-cancelling headphones, the scent produced by the resultant concentrations of skatole and indole relative to other substances in the freshener is thus "in-phase" and perceived as pleasant.

Insect attractant

Skatole is one of many compounds that are attractive to males of various species of orchid bees, which apparently gather the chemical to synthesize pheromones; it is commonly used as bait for these bees for study. It is also known for being an attractant for the Tasmanian grass grub beetle (Aphodius tasmaniae).

Skatole has been shown to be an attractant to gravid mosquitoes in both field and laboratory conditions.  Because this compound is present in feces, it is found in combined sewage overflows (CSO), as streams and lakes containing CSO water have untreated human and industrial waste.  CSO sites are thus of particular interest when studying mosquito-borne diseases such as West Nile virus.

Animal studies
Skatole occurs naturally in the feces of all species of mammals and birds, and in the bovine rumen.

Skatole has been shown to cause pulmonary edema in goats, sheep, rats, and some strains of mice. It appears to selectively target club cells, which are the major site of cytochrome P450 enzymes in the lungs. These enzymes convert skatole to a reactive intermediate, 3-methyleneindolenine, which damages cells by forming protein adducts (see fog fever).

With the testicular steroid androstenone, skatole is regarded as a principal determinant of boar taint.

Skatole contributes to bad breath.

Application
Skatole is the starting material in the synthesis of atiprosin.

See also
 1-Methylindole
 2-Methylindole (methylketol)
 5-Methylindole
 7-Methylindole
 Cadaverine

References

Methylindoles
Foul-smelling chemicals
Perfume ingredients